The 1994 Stanley Cup playoffs, the playoff tournament of the National Hockey League (NHL), began after the conclusion of the 1993–94 NHL season. The sixteen teams that qualified, eight from each conference, played best-of-seven game series for conference quarterfinals, semifinals and championships; and then the conference champions played a best-of-seven series for the Stanley Cup. The playoffs ended when the New York Rangers defeated the Vancouver Canucks in the seventh game of the 1994 Stanley Cup Finals. In total, an NHL record seven game sevens were played in this year's playoffs, two of which went to overtime.

For the first time since joining the NHL, all four former WHA teams (Edmonton, Hartford, Quebec, and Winnipeg) failed to make the playoffs. Wayne Gretzky also missed the playoffs for the first time in his career. Conversely, the San Jose Sharks became the first post-1990 expansion team to make the playoffs. All series played between Central and Pacific Division teams had a 2–3–2 format to reduce travel. This remains the last time that two Canadian teams made it to the Conference Finals in the same year, let alone faced each other in that particular round.

Playoff seeds

This was the first season of the NHL's new conference-oriented playoff format, emulating the NBA's seeding format in use then for the opening round. The following teams qualified for the playoffs:

Eastern Conference
 New York Rangers, Atlantic Division champions, Eastern Conference regular season champions, Presidents' Trophy winners – 112 points
 Pittsburgh Penguins, Northeast Division champions – 101 points
 New Jersey Devils – 106 points
 Boston Bruins – 97 points
 Montreal Canadiens – 96 points
 Buffalo Sabres – 95 points
 Washington Capitals – 88 points
 New York Islanders – 84 points

Western Conference
 Detroit Red Wings, Central Division champions, Western Conference regular season champions – 100 points
 Calgary Flames, Pacific Division champions – 97 points
 Toronto Maple Leafs – 98 points
 Dallas Stars – 97 points
 St. Louis Blues – 91 points
 Chicago Blackhawks – 87 points
 Vancouver Canucks – 85 points
 San Jose Sharks – 82 points

Playoff bracket

Conference Quarterfinals

Eastern Conference Quarterfinals

(1) New York Rangers vs. (8) New York Islanders

The New York Rangers earned the Presidents' Trophy as the NHL's best regular season team with 112 points. The Islanders qualified as the eighth seed earning 84 points during the regular season. This was the eighth playoff series between these two rivals, with the Islanders winning five of the previous seven series. They last met in the 1990 Patrick Division Semifinals which the Rangers won in five games. The Islanders won the season series earning six of ten points during this year's five game regular season series.

This was the last time that the Islanders got swept in a playoff series until the 2019 Eastern Conference Second Round.

(2) Pittsburgh Penguins vs. (7) Washington Capitals

The Pittsburgh Penguins entered the playoffs as the second seed in the Eastern Conference by winning the Northeast Division with 101 points. The Washington Capitals earned 88 points during the regular season to finish seventh overall in the Eastern Conference. This was the third playoff meeting between these two rivals, with Pittsburgh winning both previous series. They last met in the 1992 Patrick Division Semifinals which Pittsburgh won in seven games after erasing a 3–1 deficit. Washington won the season series earning five of eight points during this year's four game regular season series.

Until 2018, this was the only time the Capitals had defeated the Penguins in their first ten playoff series.

(3) New Jersey Devils vs. (6) Buffalo Sabres
The New Jersey Devils entered the playoffs as the third seed in the Eastern Conference with 106 points. The Buffalo Sabres earned 95 points during the regular season to finish sixth overall in the Eastern Conference. This was the first playoff meeting between these two teams. New Jersey won three of the four games in this year's regular season series.

(4) Boston Bruins vs. (5) Montreal Canadiens

The Boston Bruins entered the playoffs as the fourth seed in the Eastern Conference with 97 points. The Montreal Canadiens earned 96 points during the regular season to finish fifth overall in the Eastern Conference. This was the twenty-eighth playoff meeting between these two rivals, with Montreal winning twenty-two of the previous twenty-seven series. This was also the tenth time in eleven years these two team had met in the playoffs. They last met in the 1992 Adams Division Finals, which Boston won in a four-game sweep. Montreal won the season series earning six of ten points during this year's five game regular season series. Game six was the final playoff game in the Montreal Forum.

Western Conference Quarterfinals

(1) Detroit Red Wings vs. (8) San Jose Sharks

The Detroit Red Wings entered the playoffs as the Western Conference regular season champions with 100 points. The San Jose Sharks earned 82 points during the regular season to finish eighth overall in the Western Conference. This was the first playoff meeting between these two teams. The Sharks made their first appearance in the Stanley Cup playoffs in their third season since entering the league in the 1991–92 season. The most recent team to represent the San Francisco Bay Area prior to this was the Oakland Seals, who lost in the Stanley Cup Quarterfinals in 1970. Detroit won three of the four games in this year's regular season series.

(2) Calgary Flames vs. (7) Vancouver Canucks
The Calgary Flames entered the playoffs as the second seed in the Western Conference by winning the Pacific Division with 97 points. The Vancouver Canucks earned 85 points during the regular season to finish seventh overall in the Western Conference. This was the fifth playoff meeting between these two rivals, with Calgary winning three of the previous four series. They last met in the 1989 Smythe Division Semifinals which the Flames won in seven games. Calgary won the season series earning nine of fourteen points during this year's seven game regular season series.

The Canucks won the series after being down 3–1. They are the only team to date to win a series after being down 3–1 with all three games being won in overtime.

(3) Toronto Maple Leafs vs. (6) Chicago Blackhawks

The Toronto Maple Leafs entered the playoffs as the third seed in the Western Conference with 98 points. The Chicago Blackhawks earned 87 points during the regular season to finish sixth overall in the Western Conference. This was the eighth playoff meeting between these two teams, with Toronto winning five of the seven previous series. They last met in the 1986 Division Semifinals which Toronto won in a three-game sweep. These teams split their six-game regular season series. Game six was the last NHL game played at Chicago Stadium.

(4) Dallas Stars vs. (5) St. Louis Blues

The Dallas Stars entered the playoffs as the fourth seed in the Western Conference with 97 points. The St. Louis Blues earned 91 points during the regular season to finish fifth overall in the Western Conference. This was the tenth playoff meeting between these two teams, with St. Louis winning five of the nine previous series. They last met in the 1991 Norris Division Finals which the then Minnesota North Stars won in six games. Dallas won the season series earning seven of twelve points during this year's six game regular season series. This was the first time the city of Dallas was represented in the Stanley Cup playoffs.

Game four was the last game played at the St. Louis Arena.

Conference Semifinals

Eastern Conference Semifinals

(1) New York Rangers vs. (7) Washington Capitals

This was the fourth playoff meeting between these two teams, with Washington winning two of the previous three series. They last met in the 1991 Patrick Division Semifinals, which Washington won in six games.

(3) New Jersey Devils vs. (4) Boston Bruins
This was the second playoff meeting between these two teams. Their only previous meeting was in the 1988 Prince of Wales Conference Final, which Boston won in seven games.

Western Conference Semifinals

(4) Dallas Stars vs. (7) Vancouver Canucks
This was the first playoff meeting between these two teams.

(3) Toronto Maple Leafs vs. (8) San Jose Sharks
This was the first playoff meeting between these two teams.

Conference Finals

Eastern Conference Final

(1) New York Rangers vs. (3) New Jersey Devils

This was the second playoff meeting between these two teams, with New York winning the only previous series. They last met in the 1992 Division Semifinals, which New York won in seven games. New York made their third Semifinals/Conference Final appearance since the league began using a 16-team or greater playoff format in 1980. They were defeated in five games by the Montreal Canadiens in their most recent Conference Finals appearance in 1986. New Jersey made their second appearance in the Conference Final. Their most recent appearance was in the 1988 Prince of Wales Conference Final, which New Jersey lost against the Boston Bruins in five games. New York won all six games in this year's regular season series.

With a minute remaining in game one at Madison Square Garden, New York was leading 3–2. However, Devils forward Claude Lemieux tied the game on a scramble in front of New York goaltender Mike Richter. The Devils went on to win the game on Stephane Richer's breakaway goal at 15:23 of the second overtime. The Rangers evened the series winning game two in a 4–0 shutout. The series then turned to the Meadowlands in East Rutherford, New Jersey, for games three and four. Like game one, game three went into double overtime but this time it was New York who won 3–2 on Stephane Matteau's goal at 6:13 of the second overtime period. The Devils won game four by a final score of 3–1 and evened the series at 2–2. The Devils took the series lead with a 4–1 win at Madison Square Garden in game five.

Despite the fact that his team trailed in the series 3–2, Rangers captain Mark Messier made a highly publicized guarantee that New York would win game six. After trailing New Jersey by a score of 2–1 after two periods Messier himself scored a third-period hat trick to rally the Rangers to a 4–2 victory. Rangers coach Mike Keenan said of the guarantee, "Mark was sending a message to his teammates that he believed together we could win. He put on an amazing performance to make sure it happened."

Game seven played at Madison Square Garden, was a goaltending battle between New Jersey's Martin Brodeur and New York's Mike Richter. Brian Leetch gave the Rangers a 1–0 lead in the second period. Richter shut out the Devils for over 59 minutes before conceding a goal to Devils forward Valeri Zelepukin with just 7.7 seconds remaining in regulation. The two teams played into double overtime for the third time in the series and for the second time in the series it was Stephane Matteau who scored the game winner. Matteau scored on a wrap-around at 4:24 of the second overtime period as the Rangers won the game 2–1 and the series 4–3. Many consider this one of the greatest hockey playoff series of all time.

Western Conference Final

(3) Toronto Maple Leafs vs. (7) Vancouver Canucks

This was the first and to date only playoff series between these two teams. Toronto made their second consecutive and second overall Conference Final appearance. They were defeated in seven games by the Los Angeles Kings in the previous year. Vancouver made their second appearance in the Conference Final. Their most recent appearance was in the 1982 Clarence Campbell Conference Final, which Vancouver won against the Chicago Black Hawks in five games. These teams split their four-game regular season series. This remains the last Conference Finals series to be played entirely in Canada by two Canadian based teams.

Toronto won game one at Maple Leaf Gardens on Peter Zezel's goal at 16:55 of the first overtime period. After that however, the Maple Leafs could not seem to slow down the bigger, more-powerful Canucks. Vancouver edged Toronto 4–3 in game two and then shutout the Maple Leafs at the Pacific Coliseum in games three and four, by scores of 4–0 and 2–0 respectively. Down three games to one and facing elimination the Maple Leafs played much better in game five. They pushed Vancouver to double overtime but it was Vancouver forward Greg Adams who beat Leafs goaltender Felix Potvin just 14 seconds into the second overtime period to give the Canucks a 4–3 win and a 4–1 series win.

Stanley Cup Finals

This was the first and to date only playoff series between these two teams. The Rangers last won the Stanley Cup in 1940. With the Rangers having 112 points against Vancouver's 85, the 27 point difference was the largest point differential between two teams in the Stanley Cup Finals since 1982 when 41 points separated the New York Islanders (118) and Vancouver (77).

In a back and forth series that went the maximum seven games, one lengthy drought ended and another began. The Rangers won the Stanley Cup for their fourth title in franchise history, and first since , while the Canucks were the last Canadian team to play for the Stanley Cup until the  Calgary Flames. This was the longest streak that Canadian teams did not qualify for the Finals from 1995–2003 (9 years). Prior to this the longest streak of Canadian teams missing the Finals was just three years.

Playoff statistics

Skaters
These are the top ten skaters based on points.

Goaltenders
This is a combined table of the top five goaltenders based on goals against average and the top five goaltenders based on save percentage, with at least 420 minutes played. The table is sorted by GAA, and the criteria for inclusion are bolded.

References
Notes

Bibliography

See also
List of Stanley Cup champions
1994 NHL Entry Draft
1994 in sports

playoffs
Stanley Cup playoffs